Charles Henry Bibby (born November 24, 1949) is an American former professional basketball player who played for the New York Knicks, New Orleans Jazz, Philadelphia 76ers, and San Diego Clippers of the National Basketball Association (NBA). He also spent a season as a player-assistant coach for the Lancaster Lightning of the Continental Basketball Association (CBA).

His brother, Jim Bibby, was a Major League Baseball pitcher, and his son, Mike Bibby, is a former NBA point guard.

Playing career 
In 1969, Bibby shared MVP honors on the UCLA freshman team with guard Andy Hill, as Bibby was the squad's leading scorer (26.8 ppg).

Bibby was a starting point guard as the UCLA Bruins won three straight national championships in 1970, 1971 and 1972, the Bruins' sixth consecutive under head coach John Wooden. Bibby helped lead the Bruins through the first 47 games of an 88-game winning streak and was named an All-American his senior year. He was one of only four players to have started on three NCAA championship teams; the others all played for Wooden at UCLA: Lew Alcindor, Curtis Rowe, and Lynn Shackelford.

In the 1972 NBA draft, Bibby was drafted in the fourth round by the New York Knicks and in the second round of the 1972 ABA Draft by the Carolina Cougars. Bibby opted to play for the Knicks and was with the team for two-and-a-half seasons, which included an NBA title in 1973.

Bibby spent nine seasons in the NBA, and was a part of the 1977 and 1980 Philadelphia 76ers teams that made the NBA Finals but lost both times.

Coaching career 
Bibby started his coaching career in the Continental Basketball Association (CBA) and won two championships in 1982 and 1989.  He coached the Winnipeg Thunder.

In 1996, he was named coach of the men's basketball team at the University of Southern California (USC), and kept that position for nine seasons. Bibby had an overall won-loss record of 131–111 at USC. He led his 1997, 2001 and 2002 teams to the NCAA tournament, including an "Elite Eight" appearance in 2001. He was fired four games into his ninth season.

In April 2005, he was named head coach of the Los Angeles Sparks of the Women's National Basketball Association (WNBA). After 28 games, he was replaced by his assistant coach, Joe Bryant.

On January 17, 2006, Bibby was hired by the Philadelphia 76ers as an assistant coach on Maurice Cheeks' staff and remained there until the end of the 2007–2008 season, when his contract was not renewed. In February 2009 he was hired by the Memphis Grizzlies as an assistant coach. He remained with the team until 2013, when he joined the Detroit Pistons' coaching staff.

Personal life
Bibby is the brother of the late Jim Bibby (1944-2010), a former Major League Baseball pitcher, and father of Mike Bibby, who played in the NBA.  Bibby and  his son are one of four father-son duos to each win an NCAA basketball championship.  They were initially estranged after he divorced from his wife leading him to publicly state "My father is not part of my life" after winning the NCAA title in 1997, but they later reconnected starting in 2002, the peak of his NBA career.

Head coaching record

Notes

References

External links
 Henry Bibby coach profile

1949 births
Living people
20th-century African-American sportspeople
21st-century African-American people
African-American basketball players
All-American college men's basketball players
American expatriate basketball people in Mexico
American men's basketball players
American women's basketball coaches
Basketball coaches from North Carolina
Basketball players from North Carolina
Carolina Cougars draft picks
Continental Basketball Association coaches
Detroit Pistons assistant coaches
Lancaster Lightning players
Los Angeles Sparks head coaches
Memphis Grizzlies assistant coaches
New York Knicks draft picks
New York Knicks players
New Orleans Jazz players
People from Franklinton, North Carolina
Philadelphia 76ers assistant coaches
Philadelphia 76ers players
Point guards
San Diego Clippers players
UCLA Bruins men's basketball players
USC Trojans men's basketball coaches
United States Basketball League coaches
United States Basketball League players